Aviemore railway station serves the town and tourist resort of Aviemore in the Highlands of Scotland. The station, which is owned by Network Rail (NR) and managed by ScotRail, is on the Highland Main Line,  from Perth, between Kingussie and Carrbridge, and is also the southern terminus of the Strathspey preserved railway.

History 

The line was opened by the Inverness & Perth Junction Railway (I&PJR) in 1863, subsequently becoming part of the Highland Railway.

The current station was opened in 1898, to designs by the architect William Roberts when the "direct" line to Inverness via Slochd was built, making Aviemore an important junction and replacing the original 1863 building. William Roberts also provided an engine shed to the north of the station in 1896.

It became part of the London, Midland & Scottish Railway after the Grouping of 1923, then passed on to the Scottish Region of British Railways on nationalisation in 1948.

The original I&PJR line to  fell victim to the Beeching cuts, closing to passengers in October 1965.

When Sectorisation was introduced by British Rail in the 1980s, the station was served by Scotrail until the privatisation of British Rail.

In 1998 the station was restored and refurbished, and the Strathspey Railway was finally allowed to use the island platform. Following the moving of services, the Strathspey Railway closed their Aviemore (Speyside) railway station. The platform remains, as fears over asbestos contamination have stalled its removal. The original footbridge also still stands but is unsafe.

Facilities 
The new building on the northbound platform of the main line comprises a ticket hall, booking office and shop, and the three original buildings are waiting rooms (with historical displays), staff offices, and toilets. Parking is on the station's west side, and passenger access to the Strathspey part of the station is via a foot-crossing across the junction spur. This foot crossing also provides disabled access to platform 2. As there are no ticket machines, if the ticket office is closed, passengers must buy one in advance.

Platform layout 
Platform 1 on the down (northbound) line can accommodate trains having fourteen coaches, whereas platform 2 on the up (southbound) line can hold fifteen. The junction between the Strathspey Railway and Network Rail lies to the south of the station and was controlled from the station signal box, which also controlled a large portion of the main line either side of here (from  all the way to Culloden Moor since 1979) as well as the immediate station area. The station was resignalled and the loop extended in 2019, which also saw the signal box closed with control transferring to Inverness.

Passenger volume 

The statistics cover twelve month periods that start in April.

Services 
Services are provided by ScotRail, Caledonian Sleeper, and London North Eastern Railway on the Highland Main Line, and Strathspey Railway on the former Inverness & Perth Junction Railway to Boat of Garten and Broomhill.

In the May 2022 timetable, there are five trains each weekday to Edinburgh Waverley (including the Highland Chieftain to ) and seven to  southbound, plus the overnight sleeper to London Euston (the latter does not run southbound on Saturday nights or northbound on Sundays). Northbound there are eleven departures to Inverness.

On Sundays there are five trains to Edinburgh (including the King's Cross service) and two to Glasgow, along with seven to Inverness, two of which extend to Elgin.

Future proposals 
In the future, this station will be one of those to benefit from a package of timetable enhancements introduced by Transport Scotland and Scotrail. The current Perth to Inverness timetable will increase to hourly each way, with trains south of there running on alternate hours to Edinburgh and Glasgow. Journey times will be reduced by 10 minutes to both cities. As of May 2022, this has still not taken place.

References

Bibliography

External links 

 Station on navigable O.S. map
 RAILSCOT on Inverness and Aviemore Direct Railway
 RAILSCOT on Inverness and Perth Junction Railway
 Video footage of Aviemore Railway Station

Railway stations in Highland (council area)
Former Highland Railway stations
Railway stations in Great Britain opened in 1863
Railway stations served by ScotRail
Railway stations served by Caledonian Sleeper
Railway stations served by London North Eastern Railway
Category A listed buildings in Highland (council area)
Listed railway stations in Scotland
William Roberts railway stations
Heritage railway stations in Highland (council area)
1863 establishments in Scotland
Aviemore